Asciodema obsoletum is a Palearctic species of  true bug.

References
 

Miridae
Hemiptera of Europe
Insects described in 1864